Arlyn or Arlyne may refer to:

Given name
Arlyn E. Danker (1927–2016), American politician
Arlyn Phoenix (born 1944), American social activist
Arlyne Brickman (1934–2020), mafia informant

Surname
Debra Arlyn (born 1986), American pianist and singer-songwriter

See also
Arlan (disambiguation)
Arland (disambiguation)
Arleen, a feminine name, also spelled Arlene
Arlen (disambiguation)
Arlene (disambiguation)